Xia Ao (born 11 February 1999) is a Chinese footballer currently playing as a defender for Yanbian Longding.

Club career
Xia Ao would be promoted to the senior team of Wuhan Zall in the 2018 China League One campaign and be part of the  squad that gained promotion to the top tier with the club when they won the 2018 China League One division. He would go on to make his debut on 1 May 2019 in a Chinese FA Cup game against Shanghai SIPG F.C. that ended in a 3-1 defeat.

Career statistics

Honours

Club
Wuhan Zall
 China League One: 2018

References

External links

1999 births
Living people
Chinese footballers
Association football defenders
China League One players
Chinese Super League players
Wuhan F.C. players